Chekcheh Posht (also known as Chegūjeh Posht, Chegūposht-e Bālā, and Chekūjeh Posht) is a village in Khoshabar Rural District, in the Central District of Rezvanshahr County, Gilan Province, Iran. At the 2006 census, its population was 978, in 221 families.

References 

Populated places in Rezvanshahr County